The University of Lincoln is a public research university in Lincoln, England, with origins dating back to 1861. It gained university status in 1992 and its present name in 2001. The main campus is in the heart of the city of Lincoln alongside the Brayford Pool. There are satellite campuses across Lincolnshire in Riseholme and Holbeach and graduation ceremonies take place in Lincoln Cathedral.

History

19th and 20th centuries
The University of Lincoln developed out of several educational institutions, including Hull School of Art (1861), Hull Technical Institute (1893), the Roman Catholic teacher-training Endsleigh College (1905), Hull Central College of Commerce (1930), and Kingston upon Hull College of Education (1913). These merged in 1976 into Hull College of Higher Education, with a change of name to Humberside College of Higher Education in 1983, when it absorbed several courses in fishing, food and manufacturing.

It became Humberside Polytechnic in 1991. 

In 1992 it was one of many UK institutions to become full universities, as the University of Humberside.

The university developed a new campus to the southwest of Lincoln city centre, overlooking the Brayford Pool. It was renamed the University of Lincolnshire and Humberside in January 1996, entering its first 500 Lincoln based students in September 1996.

21st century

With another change of name to the University of Lincoln in October 2001, the university moved its main campus from Hull to Lincoln in 2002.

Queen Elizabeth II opened the university's main Lincoln campus, the first new city-centre campus built in the UK for several decades. Over £375 million has been invested at Brayford Pool, transforming a city-centre brownfield site, revitalising the area and attracting investment from the retail, leisure and property sectors. Economists estimate that the university has created at least 3,000 new jobs in Lincoln and generates more than £250 million a year for the local economy – doubling previous local economic growth rates.

On 28 October 2004, the National Centre for Food Manufacturing at Holbeach was reopened by John Hayes, Member of Parliament for South Holland and the Deepings, after redevelopment as a specialist food-science technology park. The consolidation involved the University of Lincoln acquiring the Leicester-based De Montfort University's schools in Lincolnshire: the Lincoln School of Art in uphill Lincoln, and the Lincolnshire School of Agriculture's sites at Riseholme, Caythorpe and Holbeach. Caythorpe was later closed and its activities moved to Riseholme. Courses held in Grimsby were also moved to Lincoln at that time.

Through the late 1990s, the university's sites in Hull were scaled down as the focus shifted towards Lincoln. In 2001 this process took a step further when it was decided to move the administrative headquarters and management to Lincoln and to sell the Cottingham Road campus in Hull, the former main campus, to its neighbour, the University of Hull. The site now houses the Hull York Medical School. Until 2012 the university maintained a smaller campus, the Derek Crothall Building, in Hull city centre. Another campus and student halls in Beverley Road, Hull, were also sold for redevelopment.

In 2012 all agricultural further education provisions were transferred from Riseholme College to Bishop Burton College. Bishop Burton College has now moved into a new, purpose-built site at the Lincolnshire Showground with only limited use of the Riseholme Campus which has now mainly reverted to the University of Lincoln from 2021 onwards. Development of the site has not been decided but the university has purchased the recently vacated Lawress Hall a former training, conferencing and wedding venue on an adjacent site which was formerly owned by the Government.

March 2021 saw the new Lincoln Medical School open in time for the 2021/2022 academic year. The building, on the Brayfood Pool campus, features lecture theatres, trainee observation theatres and a library dedicated to medical research, allied health care, pharmacy, chemistry and biology textbooks. It is run as a partnership with the University of Nottingham Medical School.

Organisation and administration

Colleges and departments
The University of Lincoln is structured as a college-based system, with each college headed by a pro vice chancellor. There are four colleges of study, each comprising schools, institutes and research centres.

College of Science
School of Chemistry
School of Computer Science
School of Engineering
Department of Geography
Department of Life Sciences
School of Mathematics and Physics
Lincoln Medical School
School of Pharmacy
National Centre for Food Manufacturing
Lincoln Institute for Agri-food Technology
College of Arts
School of Architecture and the Built Environment
School of Design
School of Film, Media and Journalism
School of Creative Arts
School of Humanities and Heritage
College of Social Science
School of Education
School of Health and Social Care
Lincoln Law School
School of Psychology
School of Social and Political Sciences
School of Sport and Exercise Science
Health and Wellbeing Hub
Lincoln International Business School
Department of Accountancy, Finance and Economics
Department of Management
Department of Marketing, Tourism and Events

College of Science
The College of Science is located across the Brayford, Riseholme and Holbeach campuses.

The School of Engineering became the first such school founded in the UK for over 20 years, opening in 2011 under collaboration with Siemens. The Isaac Newton Building, designed by Architects Allies and Morrison, incorporates Siemens Industrial Turbo-machinery Lincoln as a co-located its product-training facility.

The Department of Geography offers programmes accredited by the Royal Geographical Society. The Department of Life Sciences offers an animal behaviour clinic.

The School of Mathematics and Physics opened in September 2014 and was inaugurated in September 2016 by Professor Efim Zelmanov. Physics programmes are accredited by the Institute of Physics.

Lincoln Medical School was established in 2018 in partnership with the University of Nottingham offering registration with the General Medical Council. It is housed in the purpose built Ross Lucas Medical Sciences Building consisting of consultation rooms, a prosection anatomy suite, and a bio-medical and health sciences library.

The School of Pharmacy offers programmes accredited by the General Pharmaceutical Council. The college incorporates JBL Science a commercial research organisation.

The National Centre for Food Manufacturing is located at the Holbeach campus, with microbiology labs, product development kitchens and sensory suites.

Lincoln Institute for Agri-food Technology is based at the Riseholme campus from the 18th-century grade II listed Riseholme Hall, alongside a working farm with livestock including the Lincoln Red cattle and Lincoln Longwool sheep.

College of Art
The College of Arts undertakes research and has a range of undergraduate and postgraduate programmes. The college is the home to Siren Radio, a community radio station broadcasting on 107.3 FM and online, and the Lincoln Performing Arts Centre, a 446 seat venue, which opened in 2008.

The School of Film, Media and Journalism is home to the Media Archive for Central England and New Lincs Media. Lincoln Sound Theatre was opened in 2010 by the visiting Professor Trevor Dann.

The School of Humanities and Heritage incorporates Lincoln Conservation, the university's conservation and material analysis consultancy, works with clients including the Historic Royal Palaces and the Victoria and Albert Museum.

The School of Architecture and the Built Environment offers Royal Institute of British Architects accredited programmes. Courses are available in Hong Kong at the School for Higher and Professional Education.

College of Social Science
The Sarah Swift Building houses the School of Psychology and the School of Health and Social Care. It has a range of dedicated facilities in these fields, including psychology laboratories and a mock hospital ward.

The Health and Wellbeing Hub offers post-registration programmes and continuing professional development for qualified health and social care practitioners, accredited by the Health and Care Professions Council and the Nursing and Midwifery Council.

The School of Sports and Exercise Science is based in the Human Performance Centre which houses labs containing treadmills and ergometers, gas and lactate measuring equipment, motion detection, impact analysis, and an endless pool. Programmes are endorsed by the Chartered Institute for the Management of Sport and Physical Activity, recognised by National Strength and Conditioning Association and accredited by the International Universities Strength and Conditioning Association.

Business School
The Lincoln International Business School (LIBS), based in the David Chiddick Building, offers undergraduate, postgraduate and doctoral-level programmes. As a member of AACSB it is noted for a cross-functional approach to business education and diverse methods of delivery. Courses feature accreditation from the Chartered Management Institute, Chartered Institute Of Professional Development and Chartered Institute Of Logistics And Transport. It also offers distance learning and executive education aimed at working professionals, and students can participate ih a student managed investment fund.

Governance

Vice-Chancellors
Professor Neal Juster was installed as Vice-Chancellor of the university in October 2021, having previously served as Deputy Vice Chancellor at the University of Glasgow. His background is in mechanical engineering where he was Pro Vice-Principal, Dean of the Faculty of Engineering at the University of Strathclyde and Senior Lecturer in the Department of Mechanical Engineering, University of Leeds. The following have served as Vice-Chancellor of the university:

 1989 - 2001: Professor Roger King
 2001 - 2009: Professor David Chiddick 
 2009 - 2021: Professor Mary Stuart CBE
 2021–present: Professor Neal Juster

Chancellors
The current Chancellor, Lord Victor, was installed in December 2008. He is the former Chief Executive of the social care enterprise Turning Point, current Chair of the NHS Confederation and was one of the first individuals to become a People's Peer. The following have served as Chancellor of the university:

 1994 - 2000: Dr Harry Hooper CBE TD
 2000 - 2007: Dame Elizabeth Esteve-Coll
 2008–present: Victor Adebowale, Baron Adebowale

Pro-Chancellors 
Two Pro-Chancellors assist the Chancellor in their ceremonial duties. The current Pro-Chancellors are Dame Diane Lees CBE, as the current Chair of the Board of Governors, and Mr Haydn Biddle as the immediate past Chair. The following have served as Pro-Chancellor and Chair of the Board of Governors of the university:

 2009 - 2012: Mr Graham Secker
 2012 - 2018: Mr Haydn Biddle
 2018–present: Dame Diane Lees CBE

Academic profile

Reputation and rankings

The university's Strategic Plan 2022-2027 sets out targets of being among the top 15 of universities in the UK. Lincoln was ranked 17th by The Guardian in 2020, its highest to date. In 2017, it ranked 8th in Agriculture and Forestry and 2nd in Business and Economics in The Complete University Guide rankings. More than half its submitted research was rated as internationally excellent or world-leading in the UK's last nationwide assessment of university research standards, the 2014 Research Excellence Framework (REF 2014). It was awarded gold in the Teaching Excellence Framework (TEF 2017).

In 2020, the university was named Modern University of the Year in The Times and Sunday Times Good University 2021, as the highest-ranked multi-faculty modern university in the UK, climbing to 45th (out of 135), its highest ever position in the guide. In the same year it was named one of the world's greatest young universities in The Times Higher Education Young University Rankings, placed 14th in the UK for overall student satisfaction of the 129 mainstream universities in the National Student Survey 2020, and given a five-star rating in the QS Stars rating of global universities.

Identity
The University of Lincoln's official logo from 2001 to 2012 was the head of Minerva, an Ancient Roman goddess of wisdom and knowledge. From July 2012 this was changed to incorporate the university's coat of arms, which features swans, fleur de lys and textbooks.

Campus facilities

Libraries

The university has three libraries: the main University Library, a Library at the Holbeach Campus which is part of the National Centre for Food Manufacturing, and the Biomedical and Health Sciences Library at the Lincoln Medical School.

The University Library occupies the Great Central Warehouse (GCW) building, a renovated industrial railway-goods warehouse. It opened in December 2004 on the Brayford campus. In total it houses over 300,000 books, journals and other reference materials.

The Great Central Warehouse building was built in 1907 by the Great Central Railway. It spent the second half of the 20th century as a builder's warehouse, before falling into disrepair in 1998. It was converted into a library by the university's in-house team of architects and was formally opened in 2004 by the chief executive of the UK's Quality Assurance Agency for Higher Education. In 2005, the conversion won gold and silver for conservation and regeneration at the Royal Institution of Chartered Surveyors (RICS) Regional Awards in Leicester. It has also gained awards from the Royal Institute of British Architects (RIBA).

Live music

Built in 1874 by the Manchester, Sheffield & Lincolnshire Railway, the Engine Shed was the one surviving four-track, dead-end railway building in Lincolnshire. It opened as a refitted entertainment venue in September 2006 as the region's largest live music venue. It consists of the Engine Shed, the Platform and Tower Bar, which combined can accommodate up to 2,000 people. In 2014 the university transferred control of The Engine Shed to the Students' Union.

Performing Arts Centre

The Lincoln Performing Arts Centre (LPAC) holds a 450-seat multi-purpose auditorium designed for live arts performances, conferences and film screenings. Its events are designed to complement, rather than compete with those of neighbouring venues.

Science and Innovation Park
The Lincoln Science and Innovation Park is a large redevelopment south of the main university campus. It will comprise university facilities, including laboratories, and space for industry partners to add new offices and research facilities.

The Science and Innovation Park is being developed in partnership with the Lincolnshire Co-operative.

Sports Centre
Facilities include a double sports hall, four squash courts, synthetic pitches, a fitness suite, a dance studio, eight badminton and short tennis courts, two basketball courts, two volleyball courts, two netball courts, two five-a-side football pitches and a seven-a-side football pitch. It also holds the School of Sport And Exercise Science, the majority of whose facilities are located in the building.

Student life
According to the university, over 100 national groupings appear among the student population at the Brayford Pool campus. Based on the available  academic year data, the total student population was  undergraduates and  postgraduates.

Students' Union
The University of Lincoln Students' Union dates back to the university's formation. It was reconstituted in 2007 as a company limited by guarantee, and registered as a charity, introducing a more conventional governance structure for students' unions. It
supports and represents the students of the university; sabbatical officers are elected by the student body and supported by the staff. A number of sports teams operate in the national BUCS' leagues, competing nationally against other institutions.

The Students' Union was awarded NUS (National Union of Students) Higher Education Students' Union of the Year 2014/15 at an annual awards ceremony.

In 2014, ownership of the on-campus pub The Shed was transferred to the Students' Union after its acquisition from Greene King. It was later renamed The Swan. In 2015, the Students' Union was awarded Best Bar None Gold and named second in the Best Bar None Safest Venue category.

In 2016, after a student referendum, the Students' Union voted to disaffiliate from the NUS, due to dissatisfaction after the controversial 2016 NUS Conference. The decision was taken to formally leave the NUS in December, but a second referendum was held after approaches from students who opposed the first vote. The re-run had 1,302 students voting to remain part of the NUS and 437 backing disaffiliation.

The issue arose again in 2019, after consultations with students at All Student Member meetings in 2018 and 2019. However, the backlash across the student body caused a referendum to be held to leave the NUS. This proposed disaffiliation from the NUS on 1 January 2020: a total of 2614 (15.7%) of students voted, with 996 to remain, 1,539 to leave and 79 abstaining.

Student accommodation
Lincoln offers many accommodation options for students. The university owns and operates the Student Village, including the Lincoln Courts and Cygnet Wharf; a waterfront complex situated on the Brayford Pool Campus. In Lincoln Courts, there are 17 blocks of self-catering apartments, each apartment housing five to eight students, and Cygnet Wharf, three buildings with flats of 10–12 residents. The site has a range of facilities, with a total of 1,037+ bedrooms available including apartments specifically designed for students with disabilities.

Furthermore, there is a range of other University-owned and private off-campus student accommodation in Lincoln.

Notable people

Academics
Jane Chapman – Professor of Communications
Carenza Lewis – Professor for the Public Understanding of Research
Stephen McKay – Professor of Social Research

Alumni
Gordon Baldwin – potter
David Firth – animator and visual artist
Jonathan Foyle – architectural historian
Andrea Jenkyns – MP for Morley and Outwood
Tom Marshall – artist and photo coloriser
Paul Noble – visual artist
Vicki Phillips – educator and director at the Bill & Melinda Gates Foundation
Chris Rankin – film actor
Thomas Ridgewell – YouTube video creator
Jayne Sharp – broadcaster
Martin Vickers – MP for Cleethorpes
Juan Watterson – MHK for Rushen and Speaker of the House of Keys
Dan Wood – broadcaster
Paul Staines – political blogger for the Guido Fawkes website

See also
Armorial of UK universities
College of Education
Lincoln College of Art
List of universities in the UK
National Centre for Food Manufacturing
Post-1992 universities

Lincoln is one of two universities in the city, the other being Bishop Grosseteste University.

References

External links

University of Lincoln
University of Lincoln Students' Union

University of Lincoln
Educational institutions established in 1996
1996 establishments in England
Universities and colleges formed by merger in the United Kingdom
Universities UK

de:Universität Lincoln